Gymnocladus chinensis, the soap tree or Chinese coffeetree, is a tree in the subfamily Caesalpinioideae of the pea family Fabaceae, native to central China. The leaves have huge bipinnate leaves starting purple then shading to green.

References

http://www.pfaf.org/user/Plant.aspx?LatinName=Gymnocladus+chinensis

Caesalpinioideae
Plants described in 1875
Taxa named by Henri Ernest Baillon